Jack Cantoni (11 May 1948 – 25 June 2013) was a French international rugby union player.

Cantoni was born in Carmaux, France, he is the son of the rugby league footballer; Vincent Cantoni.

Cantoni played as a Fullback or Wing for AS Béziers, with which team he won seven French championships. He made his international debut for France on 4 April 1970 in a test during the Five Nations against Wales in Cardiff.

Honours 
 Selected to represent France, 1971–1974
 French rugby champion, 1971, 1972, 1974, 1975, 1977, 1978 and 1980 with AS Béziers
 Challenge Yves du Manoir 1972, 1975 and 1977 with AS Béziers
 French championship finalist 1976 with AS Béziers

References

External links

1948 births
2013 deaths
French rugby union players
France international rugby union players
Rugby union fullbacks
Sportspeople from Tarn (department)
Stade Toulousain players
AS Béziers Hérault players